These are the 1972 Five Nations Championship squads:

England

Head coach: John Elders

 John Barton
 Mike Beese
 Alan Brinn
 Mike Burton
 Peter Dixon (c.)
 David Duckham
 Geoff Evans
 Keith Fielding
 Bob Hiller (c.)*
 Jeremy Janion
 Peter Knight
 Nick Martin
 Tony Neary
 Alan Old
 John Pullin
 Chris Ralston
 Andy Ripley
 Stack Stevens
 Rodney Webb
 Jan Webster
Lionel Weston

 captain in the first two games

France

Head coach: Fernand Cazenave

 Jean-Michel Aguirre
 Jean-Louis Azarete
 Richard Astre
 Max Barrau
 Jean-Pierre Bastiat
 René Benesis
 Jean-Louis Berot
 Roland Bertranne
 Pierre Biemouret
 Victor Boffelli
 Yvan Buonomo
 Jack Cantoni
 Benoît Dauga (c.)*
 Claude Dourthe
 Bernard Duprat
 Alain Esteve
 Jean Iracabal
 Jean-Pierre Lux
 Jean-Louis Martin
 Jo Maso
 Olivier Saisset
 Jean Sillieres
 Jean-Claude Skrela
 Claude Spanghero
 Walter Spanghero (c.)**
 Jean Trillo
 Armand Vaquerin
 Pierre Villepreux (c.)***

 captain in the first game
 captain in the second and third game
 captain in the fourth game

Ireland

Head coach: Syd Millar

 Con Feighery
 Kevin Flynn
 Mike Gibson
 Tom Grace
 Denis Hickie
 Ken Kennedy
 Tom Kiernan (c.)
 Sean Lynch
 Willie John McBride
 Barry McGann
 Stewart McKinney
 Ray McLoughlin
 Arthur McMaster
 John Moloney
 Fergus Slattery

 Ireland used 15 players in two games

Scotland

Head coach: Bill Dickinson

 Rodger Arneil
 Ian Barnes
 Alastair Biggar
 Arthur Brown
 Gordon Brown
 Peter Brown (c.)
 Sandy Carmichael
 Bobby Clark
 Lewis Dick
 John Frame
 Alan Lawson
 Nairn MacEwan
 Ian McCrae
 Alastair McHarg
 Ian McLauchlan
 Duncan Paterson
 Jim Renwick
 Billy Steele
 Colin Telfer

 Scotland played three games

Wales

Head coach: Clive Rowlands

 Phil Bennett
 Roy Bergiers
 John Bevan
 Gerald Davies
 Mervyn Davies
 Gareth Edwards
 Geoff Evans
 Barry John
 Arthur Lewis
 Barry Llewelyn
 John Lloyd (c.)
 Dai Morris
 Derek Quinnell
 John Taylor
 Delme Thomas
 J.P.R. Williams
 Jeff Young

 Wales played three games

External links
1972 Five Nations Championship at ESPN

Six Nations Championship squads